Mariam Temitope Masha is the senior special assistant to the president of the Federal Republic of Nigeria on humanitarian interventions. Prior to that appointment, she served as the senior special assistant to the president of Nigeria on internally displaced persons. She has also served as a strategic advisor to the vice president on North-East interventions.  She is a member of the five-person board of trustees for the North East Children's Trust (NECT), where she serves as executive secretary, and a visiting lecturer at the African Leadership Center (ALC) of King's College London.

Personal life and education 
Masha was born in Lagos State. She is married and has two children. Masha obtained a Bachelor of Dental Surgery degree from the University of Lagos, Lagos State, in 2000. Three years later, she earned a Master of Public Health (MPH) from Johns Hopkins Bloomberg School of Public Health. In 2013, Masha became an Archbishop Desmond Tutu Leadership Fellow, and in 2015 she obtained a post graduate diploma in organizational leadership from the University of Oxford.

Career 
After her first degree, Masha worked as a dental house officer in Lagos University Teaching Hospital. Then, she traveled to the United States to pursue a post doctoral degree from Johns Hopkins Bloomberg School of Public Health. There, she carried out primary research on the burden of disease from road traffic injuries in Sub Saharan Africa, and South Asia.  She returned to Nigeria where she served as an executive secretary for the Arrive Alive Road Safety Initiative and became the World Health Organization (WHO) country consultant on road traffic injury prevention in Nigeria. While she served in that capacity, she doubled as a board member of the WHO Mentor-VIP core group. Masha has served in the public sector for over twelve years, starting as the senior special assistant (SSA) to Babatunde Fashola, the 13th governor of Lagos State, on transport education, where she worked on transport sector reform through human capacity development. She held the position for two consecutive terms (2007-2015). As SSA transport education, she was charged with the responsibility of establishing the Lagos State Law Enforcement Institute (LETI) in 2013; an agency established to produce well-trained law enforcement officers including but not limited to LASTMA, KAI, Neigbhourhood Watch and Vehicle Inspection Service (VIS) officers, who are self-motivated, interdependent, community-oriented, critical – thinkers and problem solvers; thoroughly indoctrinated in the ethics, professional standards and tactical proficiency of the law enforcement profession through the development of professional standards and delivery of quality training.

In June 2015, Masha was appointed to the role of senior special assistant to the president of Nigeria on internally displaced persons by the Buhari administration. She served as the project lead for the execution of the Recovery and Peace Building Assessment (RPBA) on behalf of Nigeria in collaboration with the World Bank, European Union and United Nations where she developed the report which was used as the basis for producing the North East Development Plan.

In October 2019, Masha represented the federal government in hosting the Nigeria Side event at the 74th United Nations General Assembly, "Tackling Poverty for Greater Inclusion in a Digital Age" which was held in the United Nations Headquarters.

References

Sources
 Bank, T. (2019). North-East Nigeria - Recovery and peacebuilding assessment. Retrieved 17 December 2019, from North-East Nigeria - Recovery and peacebuilding assessment
 Board of Trustees – The North East Children’s Trust. (2019). Retrieved 17 December 2019, from Board of Trustees – The North East Children’s Trust
 Nigeria: Women, Stop Sitting On the Fence. (2019). Retrieved 17 December 2019, from 
 Quay, S. (2019). Mariam Masha PhD. Retrieved 17 December 2019, from Mariam Masha PhD
 Terror: FG, global agencies complete assessment mission in Northeast. (2019). Retrieved 17 December 2019, from Terror: FG, global agencies complete assessment mission in Northeast
 The African Leadership Centre a joint initiative of King’s College London and the University of Nairobi. (2019). Retrieved 17 December 2019, from The African Leadership Centre a joint initiative of King’s College London and the University of Nairobi
 The Full List Of 101 Presidential Aides Revealed ⋆. (2019). Retrieved 17 December 2019, from The Full List Of 101 Presidential Aides Revealed ⋆
 WHO | Nigeria. (2019). Retrieved 17 December 2019, from WHO | Nigeria

Year of birth missing (living people)
Living people
Nigerian humanitarians
Yoruba women in politics
Nigerian women in politics
University of Lagos alumni
Johns Hopkins Bloomberg School of Public Health alumni
Alumni of the University of Oxford
20th-century births
People from Lagos State